James Arthur Rodgers (13 July 1897 – 27 November 1973) was an Australian rules footballer who played with South Melbourne and Geelong in the Victorian Football League (VFL).

Notes

External links 

1897 births
1973 deaths
Australian rules footballers from Victoria (Australia)
Sydney Swans players
Geelong Football Club players